Ferrante is both a given name and a surname. Notable people with the name include:

Italian nobility
Antonio Ferrante Gonzaga, Duke of Guastalla (1687–1729)
Don Ferrante (1423–1494), Ferdinand I, King of Naples
Ferrante II of Naples (1469–1496), Ferdinand II, King of Naples
Ferrante I Gonzaga (1507–1557), Italian condottiero (mercenary), Count of Guastalla
Ferrante II Gonzaga, Duke of Guastalla (1563–1630)
Ferrante III Gonzaga, Duke of Guastalla (1618–1678)

Given  name
Ferrante Aporti, Italian educator
Ferrante Bacciocchi, Italian painter
Ferrante Imperato (c. 1525 – c. 1615), apothecary of Naples
Ferrante Pallavicino, Italian writer

Surname
Andrea Ferrante (born 1968), Italian composer
Arthur Ferrante (1921–2009), of the American Ferrante & Teicher piano duo
Bruno Ferrante, Italian politician
Damon Ferrante, American composer
Elena Ferrante, Italian novelist
Frank Ferrante, American actor
Jack Ferrante, American football player
Jeanne Ferrante, computer scientist
John Ferrante, American physicist
Louis Ferrante, American writer
Marco Ferrante, Italian football player
Michael Ferrante, Australian football player
Robert Ferrante, American news producer
Russell Ferrante, American jazz pianist
Ugo Ferrante, Italian football player

See also